Alloionematidae is a family of nematodes belonging to the order Rhabditida.

Genera:
 Alloionema Schneider, 1859
 Cheilobus Cobb, 1924
 Leptodera Dujardin, 1845

References

Nematodes